Iberia Academy and Junior College are historic school buildings located at Iberia, Miller County, Missouri.  The four buildings are the dormitory (1905), the administration building (1922-1924), the gymnasium (1927), and "president's home" (1888).  The buildings sit at odd angles within a triangle of approximately 2.66 acres. The school was supported mainly by the Congregational church, the Academy was known early on as the "Ozark Experiment". The buildings were largely built by student labor.  The school closed in 1951.

It was added to the National Register of Historic Places in 1980.

References

School buildings on the National Register of Historic Places in Missouri
School buildings completed in 1927
Schools in Miller County, Missouri
National Register of Historic Places in Miller County, Missouri
1927 establishments in Missouri